Viet gian refers to a Vietnamese person who sells Vietnamese interests. This term has existed since the imperial era of Vietnam and was later used by both the North Vietnamese and South Vietnamese to refer to supporters of the other side.

North Vietnam  

Since 1945, the Viet Minh have officially used it in legal documents to refer to the Vietnamese who cooperated or collaborated with French colonists. The policies of the Viet Minh include "arming the people, punishing the Việt gian" and "confiscation of the assets of the French and Japanese imperialists and the Việt gian." On January 20, 1953, Ho Chi Minh issued Order No. 133-SL in North Vietnam to punish the Việt gian.

South Vietnam  

It is believed that the term "Việt Cộng" is a contraction of the term Việt gian cộng sản ("Communist Traitor to Vietnam").

See also  

 Hanjian

References 

 
 

Vietnamese words and phrases
Political slurs for people
History of Vietnam
Treason